Kazimierz Michał Pac (died 1719) was a Polish nobleman, Great Notary of Lithuania, Knight of Malta, Court Marshal of Lithuania from 1708 until 1709.

Bibliography 
 Polski Słownik Biograficzny, t. XXIV, s. 707.

External links 
 Pacowie

1719 deaths
Kazimierz Michal
Polish nobility
Knights of Malta
Year of birth unknown